Nor Iryani Hasmi (born 8 April 1986) is an international Malaysian lawn bowler.

Bowls career
In 2004, she made her international debut and then in 2005 became the first Malaysian woman to win the World Singles Champion of Champions title.

She won the triples silver medal at the 2005 Asia Pacific Bowls Championships in Melbourne and also in 2005, she won the gold medal in the triples event at the 2005 Southeast Asian Games in Angeles City.

She won a gold medal in the women's triples with Nor Hashimah Ismail and Azlina Arshad at the 2006 Commonwealth Games in Melbourne.

From 2007 to 2010 she did not compete whilst she studied but returned for the 2010 Commonwealth Games.

References

1986 births
Living people
Bowls players at the 2006 Commonwealth Games
Bowls players at the 2010 Commonwealth Games
Malaysian female bowls players
Commonwealth Games gold medallists for Malaysia
Commonwealth Games medallists in lawn bowls
Southeast Asian Games medalists in lawn bowls
Competitors at the 2005 Southeast Asian Games
Southeast Asian Games gold medalists for Malaysia
21st-century Malaysian women
Medallists at the 2006 Commonwealth Games